John Vaughan (by 1525 – 1574) was a Welsh politician.

He was the eldest son of Hugh Vaughan of Kidwelly.

He was Mayor of Carmarthen in 1554–5 and 1563–4, and an alderman in 1555. He was a justice of the peace for Carmarthenshire from 1559 until his death and was appointed High Sheriff of Carmarthenshire for 1562–63. He was elected a Member (MP) of the Parliament of England for Carmarthen Boroughs in 1558 and 1571 and Carmarthenshire in 1572.

He married Catherine, the daughter of Henry Morgan of Muddlescwm, with whom he had two sons, Henry and Walter, and one daughter.

References

 

1574 deaths
English MPs 1558
Members of the Parliament of England (pre-1707) for constituencies in Wales
Year of birth uncertain
High Sheriffs of Carmarthenshire
Mayors of places in Wales
English MPs 1571